Michel Rozan (16 June 1906 – 25 November 1974) was a French wrestler. He competed in the men's freestyle bantamweight at the 1928 Summer Olympics.

References

External links
 

1906 births
1974 deaths
French male sport wrestlers
Olympic wrestlers of France
Wrestlers at the 1928 Summer Olympics
Place of birth missing